"Amazing" is a song written and recorded by American pop singer Josh Kelley. It was released in April 2003 via Hollywood Records as his debut single and the first single from his 2003 studio album, For the Ride Home. It is his highest peaking song on the Billboard Hot 100 in the United States, peaking at number 79.

Use in other media
"Amazing" was used in the 2004 film Raising Helen and in the television series Smallville.

Charts

Weekly charts

Year-end charts

References

2003 debut singles
Josh Kelley songs
Hollywood Records singles
Songs written by Josh Kelley
2003 songs